

The Liepāja Lighthouse (Latvian: Liepājas bāka) is a lighthouse located in Liepāja on the Latvian coast of the Baltic Sea.

History
The lighthouse is located on the southern bank of the civil harbour of Liepāja, near the entrance. It was built of cast iron from resmelted ship-wreckage in 1868. During its lifetime the lighthouse suffered wartime damage, mainly during World War I, when it was hit by sixteen rounds fired by the German light cruiser SMS Augsburg. Their traces have survived to the present day, as indentations in the lighthouse's external cladding. The new iron sheets covering the lighthouse bear the inscription KOD, meaning they have come from Liepāja, the port and harbour town the lighthouse is located in. Currently the lighthouse's top viewing gallery can be accessed by an internal staircase of one hundred and forty nine steps.

See also
 List of lighthouses in Latvia

References

External links

Lighthouses completed in 1868
Resort architecture in Latvia
Lighthouses in Latvia